Pedro Juan Benítez Domínguez (born 23 March 1981) is a Paraguayan former footballer. He last played for Deportivo Capiatá.

Benítez was part of the silver medal-winning Paraguayan football team at the 2004 Summer Olympics, who achieved a quarter-final place with two victories in the qualifying round, and, having finished second in the league, beat South Korea in the quarter-finals, and Iraq in the semi-finals, before losing to Argentina in the final.

During his career Benítez played for Sportivo San Lorenzo, Sportivo Luqueño, Olimpia, Cerro Porteño, Libertad, FC Shakhtar Donetsk, Tigres and Atlético Mineiro.

He has also represented the Paraguay national football team 12 times since 2004, and he has scored one goal.

See also
 Players and Records in Paraguayan Football

References

External links

1981 births
Living people
Paraguayan footballers
Paraguayan expatriate footballers
Paraguay international footballers
Paraguay under-20 international footballers
Footballers at the 2004 Summer Olympics
Olympic footballers of Paraguay
Olympic silver medalists for Paraguay
Club Sportivo San Lorenzo footballers
Sportivo Luqueño players
Club Olimpia footballers
Cerro Porteño players
Club Libertad footballers
Tigres UANL footballers
FC Shakhtar Donetsk players
Clube Atlético Mineiro players
2004 Copa América players
Liga MX players
Paraguayan Primera División players
Expatriate footballers in Brazil
Expatriate footballers in Mexico
Expatriate footballers in Ukraine
People from San Lorenzo, Paraguay
Olympic medalists in football
Medalists at the 2004 Summer Olympics
Association football central defenders